Nyi Sein (born 4 January 1964) is a Burmese politician who currently serves as a House of Nationalities member of parliament for Shan State No. 5 constituency.

Early life and education
He was born on 4 January 1964 in Namhkam, Shan State, Burma (Myanmar). He graduated with B.Sc from Mandalay University.

Political career
He is a member of the Ta'ang National Party. In the Myanmar general election, 2015, he was elected as an Amyotha Hluttaw MP and elected representative from Shan State No. 5 parliamentary constituency. He also serves as a member of Amyotha Hluttaw Women and Children's Rights Committee.

References

Burmese politicians
1964 births
Living people
People from Shan State
Mandalay University alumni